Clungunford is a civil parish in Shropshire, England.  It contains 19 listed buildings that are recorded in the National Heritage List for England.  Of these, two are listed at Grade II*, the middle of the three grades, and the others are at Grade II, the lowest grade.  The parish contains the village of Clungunford, and the smaller settlements of Abcott and Beckjay, and is otherwise rural.  Most of the listed buildings are houses, farmhouses and farm buildings, many of which are timber framed.  The other listed buildings include a 14th-century church and a cross base in the churchyard, a bridge, and a country house.


Key

Buildings

References

Citations

Sources

Lists of buildings and structures in Shropshire